The Nova 33 is a Swedish sailboat that was designed by Peter Norlin as a cruiser and first built in 1981.

The boat is often referred to as the Albin Nova, Albin 10 Metre, Albin 99 Nova and the Albin Nova 33. It was marketed by the manufacturer as the Albin Nova 33.

Production
The design was built by Albin Marine in Sweden between 1981 and 1997. Some later boats were produced by Express Production AB, also of Sweden. In total about 500 boats were completed, but it is now out of production.

Design

The Nova 33 is a recreational keelboat, built predominantly of fibreglass, with wood trim. It has a 7/8 fractional sloop rig with aluminum spars, a keel-stepped mast, wire standing rigging and a single set of swept spreaders. The hull has a raked stem, a reverse transom, an internally mounted spade-type rudder controlled by a tiller and a fixed fin keel. It displaces  and carries  of cast iron ballast.

The design has sleeping accommodation for six people, with a double "V"-berth in the bow cabin, an "L"-shaped settee and a straight settee in the main cabin and an aft cabin with a double berth on the starboard side. The main cabin also has a drop-leaf table. The galley is located on the port side just forward of the companionway ladder. The galley is "L"-shaped and is equipped with a two-burner stove and a double sink. A navigation station is opposite the galley, on the starboard side. The head is located just aft of the bow cabin on the starboard side.

For sailing the design may be equipped with a symmetrical spinnaker.

Operational history
The boat is supported by an active class club based in Sweden, that organizes racing events, the Novaförbundet (English: Nova Association).

See also
List of sailing boat types

References

External links

Keelboats
1980s sailboat type designs
Sailing yachts
Sailboat type designs by Peter Norlin
Sailboat types built by Albin Marine
Sailboat types built by Express Production AB